Essex/Billing Airstrip  is located  east of Essex, Ontario, Canada, near Marshfield.

References

Essex, Ontario
Registered aerodromes in Essex County, Ontario

pms:Essex Airport